Apistobuthus is a genus of scorpions in the family Buthidae. It was described by Susan Finnegan in 1932, and was for a long time considered to be monotypic, containing the single species A. pterygocercus. In 1998, a second species, A. susanae, was described by Wilson Lourenço; its specific epithet commemorates Susan Finnegan. A. susanae differs from A. pterygocercus in having stouter legs and pedipalps, among other characteristics.

References

Buthidae